Zakary Sebastien Shinall (born October 14, 1968) is an American former professional baseball relief pitcher. He played in Major League Baseball (MLB) who played briefly for the Seattle Mariners during their 1993 season. Listed at 6' 3" (1.90 m), 215 lb. (97 kg), Shinall batted and threw right-handed.

Career
Shinall was originally selected by the Los Angeles Dodgers in the 29th round of the 1987 MLB Draft out of El Camino College in Torrance, California, where he played for the school's team. He was traded by the Dodgers to the Cleveland Indians at the end of 1992 and eventually elected off waivers by Seattle from the Indians.

Shinall hurled  innings of relief in his 1993 debut against the Chicago White Sox, allowing one earned run on four hits and two walks and no strikeouts. He did not have a decision and never appeared in a major league game again.

He also pitched eight seasons in the Minor Leagues spanning 1987–1995, posting a 38–30 record with a 3.86 ERA and 331 strikeouts in 265 pitching appearances, including 49 starts and one shutout in 560 innings of work.

In between, Shinall played winter ball with the Leones del Caracas of the Venezuelan League during the 1991–1992 season.

External links

Retrosheet
The Baseball Gauge
Venezuela Winter League

1968 births
Living people
Albuquerque Dukes players
American expatriate baseball players in Canada
Bakersfield Dodgers players
Baseball players from St. Louis
Calgary Cannons players
Charlotte Knights players
El Camino Warriors baseball players
Great Falls Dodgers players
Gulf Coast Dodgers players
Leones del Caracas players
American expatriate baseball players in Venezuela
Major League Baseball pitchers
New Orleans Zephyrs players
San Antonio Missions players
Seattle Mariners players
Vero Beach Dodgers players
El Segundo High School alumni